Civilian checkpoints or security checkpoints are distinguishable from border or frontier checkpoints in that they are erected and enforced within contiguous areas under military or paramilitary control. Civilian checkpoints have been employed within conflict-ridden areas all over the world to monitor and control the movement of people and materials in order to prevent violence. They have also been used by police during peacetime to help counter terrorism.

Contemporary examples 

Though practices and enforcement vary, checkpoints have been used in:
 Airports and other transportation hubs across the world, including those managed by the TSA in the United States.
 Post World War II checkpoints in Germany
 The former Yugoslavia during the Yugoslav Wars.
 Northern Ireland by the Official IRA, Provisional IRA, Irish National Liberation Army, and Real IRA as well as by the British Army, Royal Ulster Constabulary, Police Service of Northern Ireland and also by the Ulster Defense Association and the Ulster Volunteer Force.
 Colombia, by military and paramilitary forces.
 Palestinian territories, by the Israeli Defence Force.
 Mexico, by military and police forces.
 Since the terrorist bombings in Pakistan, they are widely seen across all over Pakistan specially on entrance and exit points of big cities.
 French Guiana, by the National Gendarmerie.
 Riau Islands, by military and paramilitary forces.

Advantages 
Checkpoints provide many advantages, including the ability to control how people enter so that security personnel (be it governmental or civilian) can screen entrants to identify known troublemakers (be they criminals, terrorists, or simple rabble-rousers) and locate contraband items.

Effects of checkpoints 
Checkpoints typically lead to hardship for the affected civilians, though these effects range from inconvenience to mortal danger. Bir Zeit University, for example, has conducted several studies highlighting the effects of checkpoints in the Palestinian territories.

In Colombia, the paramilitary forces of the AUC have, according to Amnesty International, imposed limits on the food entering villages, with over 30 people being killed at the checkpoint in one instance.

See also 
 Airport security
 Border checkpoint
 Freedom of movement
 Random checkpoint

References

External links 
 FMI 3-07.22 "Counterinsurgency Operations", October 2004 (Expires 1 October 2006), Appendix C "Population and Resources Control"

Checkpoints
Military tactics